The Akshardham Metro Station is a Delhi Metro station on Blue line operated by the Delhi Metro Rail Corporation Limited. The station lies between Pandav Nagar on one side and the Akshardham Mandir and the Commonwealth Games Village on the other side. It was designed to be a complement of the Akshardham Mandir located nearby. When it was completed on 12 November 2009, the station was the tallest metro station within the Delhi Metro system (the record is currently held by the Mayur Vihar-I metro station on the Pink Line). The station serves commuters travelling to the mandir and provided transport for the 2010 Commonwealth Games.

Station layout

Facilities
ATMs are available at Akshardham metro station are HDFC Bank, Punjab National Bank, Yes Bank.

See also

List of Delhi Metro stations
Transport in Delhi
Delhi Metro Rail Corporation
Delhi Suburban Railway

References

External links

 Delhi Metro Rail Corporation Ltd. (Official site) 
 Delhi Metro Annual Reports
 
 UrbanRail.Net – descriptions of all metro systems in the world, each with a schematic map showing all stations.

Delhi Metro stations
Railway stations opened in 2009
2009 establishments in Delhi
Railway stations in East Delhi district